Campus Katta is an Indian Marathi language film directed by Sanjeev Kolte and produced by Prathamesh Gadve. The film stars Santosh Juvekar, Namrata Gaikwad and Sheetal Dabholkar, Swati Chitnis. Music by Pravin Kuvar. The film was released on 18 April 2014.

Synopsis 
College and youngsters as they fight corruption in their for-profit university.

Cast 
 Santosh Juvekar as Raja Sinde
 Namrata Gaikwad as Sakhi
 Sheetal Dabholkar as Rasika
 Swati Chitnis
 Arun Nalawade as Annasaheb Gunthe Patil
 Milind Shinde as Kolse Patil
 Rahulraj Dongre as Bhairav
 Vikram Gokhale as Principal Kocharekar
 Kishori Shahane

Soundtrack

Critical response 
Campus Katta film received negative reviews from critics. A Reviewer of The Times of India gave the film 2.5 stars out of 5 and wrote "The actors carry the film on their able shoulders but the treatment given to it could have been better". Soumitra Pote of Maharashtra Times gave the film 2 stars out of 5 and wrote "While making a film with such talented actors, it is important to remember that their efforts should be justified. Otherwise, everything becomes a game of deception". A Reviewer of Divya Marathi wrote "It's campus katta with irrelevant scenes, pointless dialogues, artificial acting and stray subject matter and not even a single Katta".

References

External links
 
 

2014 films
2010s Marathi-language films
Indian drama films